This is a list of German football transfers in the summer transfer window 2013 by club. Only transfers of the Bundesliga, and 2. Bundesliga are included.

Bundesliga

Bayern Munich

In:

Out:

Note: Flags indicate national team as has been defined under FIFA eligibility rules. Players may hold more than one non-FIFA nationality.

Borussia Dortmund

In:

Out:

Bayer 04 Leverkusen

In:

Out:

FC Schalke 04

In:

Out:

SC Freiburg

In:

Out:

Eintracht Frankfurt

In:

Out:

Hamburger SV

In:

Out:

Borussia Mönchengladbach

In:

Out:

Hannover 96

In:

Out:

1. FC Nürnberg

In:

Out:

VfL Wolfsburg

In:

Out:

VfB Stuttgart

In:

Out:

1. FSV Mainz 05

In:

Out:

Werder Bremen

In:

Out:

FC Augsburg

In:

Out:

1899 Hoffenheim

In:

Out:

Hertha BSC

In:

Out:

Eintracht Braunschweig

In:

Out:

2. Bundesliga

Fortuna Düsseldorf

In:

Out:

SpVgg Greuther Fürth

In:

Out:

1. FC Kaiserslautern

In:

Out:

FSV Frankfurt

In:

Out:

1. FC Köln

In:

Out:

1860 Munich

In:

Out:

1. FC Union Berlin

In:

Out:

Energie Cottbus

In:

Out:

VfR Aalen

In:

Out:

FC St. Pauli

In:

Out:

SC Paderborn 07

In:

Out:

FC Ingolstadt 04

In:

Out:

VfL Bochum

In:

Out:

FC Erzgebirge Aue

In:

Out:

Dynamo Dresden

In:

Out:

SV Sandhausen

In:

Out:

Karlsruher SC

In:

Out:

Arminia Bielefeld

In:

Out:

See also
 2013–14 Bundesliga
 2013–14 2. Bundesliga

References

External links
 Official site of the DFB 
 kicker.de 
 Official site of the Bundesliga 
 Official site of the Bundesliga 

Football transfers summer 2013
Trans
2013